Bjarke Refslund is a Danish mountain bike orienteer. He won a silver medal in the relay at the 2010 World MTB Orienteering Championships in Montalegre and a gold medal in the relay at the 2011 World MTB Orienteering Championships in Vicenza, together with Erik Skovgaard Knudsen and Lasse Brun Pedersen.

References

External links
 

Danish orienteers
Male orienteers
Danish male cyclists
Mountain bike orienteers
Living people
Place of birth missing (living people)
Year of birth missing (living people)